The communauté de communes de Chénérailles (Community of communes of Chénérailles) was located in the Creuse département of the Limousin region of central France. It was created in January 2002. It was merged into the new Communauté de communes Marche et Combraille en Aquitaine in January 2017.

It comprised the following 10 communes:
Le Chauchet
Chénérailles
Issoudun-Létrieix
Lavaveix-les-Mines
Peyrat-la-Nonière
Puy-Malsignat
Saint-Chabrais
Saint-Dizier-la-Tour
Saint-Médard-la-Rochette
Saint-Pardoux-les-Cards

References 

Chenerailles